Kimiora Poi (born 1 November 1997) is a New Zealand netball international. She was a member of the New Zealand teams that won the 2017 Netball World Youth Cup, the 2018 Fast5 Netball World Series and the 2021 Constellation Cup. Since 2018, Poi has played for Mainland Tactix in the ANZ Premiership. Poi was a prominent member of the 2020 and 2021 Mainland Tactix teams that played in two successive grand finals. Ahead of the 2022 season, Poi was appointed Tactix captain.

Early life, family and education
Kimiora is a Māori with Ngāti Porou affiliations. She was born in Gisborne, New Zealand. She is the daughter of Billy Poi and Roanne Baker. The Poi family lived in Tikitiki, where Roanne was the principal of the local school. Kimiora and her two sisters, Jade and Ashleigh, all attended Tikitiki School where they began playing netball. The family later moved to Napier, where Kimiora attended Napier Girls' High School. In 2016, while playing for Central Zone, she attended Victoria University, where she studied Criminology and Māori Studies. In 2017, after joining Mainland Tactix, she switched her studies to the University of Canterbury. Kimiora has three siblings, all of whom play sports. Her older brother, Morgan Poi, has played rugby union for Wellington Lions in the Mitre 10 Cup. Her two sisters have both played in the National Netball League. Ashleigh Poi has also played for the New Zealand Maori schoolgirl team.

Playing career

Central Zone
In 2016 and 2017, Poi played for Central Zone in the National Netball League. Her team mates included Karin Burger and Tiana Metuarau. She was a member of the Central Zone teams that were 2016 NNL grand finalists and 2017 NNL premiers.

Central Pulse
Ahead of the 2017 ANZ Premiership season, Poi was contracted as a training partner with Central Pulse. Poi's opportunities at Pulse were limited. She was kept out of the team by Claire Kersten, Whitney Souness, Mila Reuelu-Buchanan and Renee Savai'inaea. Despite this, on 8 May 2017, in a Round 7 match against Northern Stars, she made her ANZ Premiership debut with Pulse, making a brief three-minute appearance in the final quarter. It was her only match for Pulse.

Mainland Tactix
Since 2018, Poi has played for Mainland Tactix in the ANZ Premiership. She quickly established herself as regular member of the Tactix team. Together with  Jane Watson, Erikana Pedersen and Te Paea Selby-Rickit, Poi was a prominent member of the 2020 and 2021 Mainland Tactix teams that played in two successive grand finals. Ahead of the 2022 season, Poi was appointed Tactix captain, taking over from  the pregnant Jane Watson. She became the first Māori to captain Tactix.

Collingwood Magpies
In 2019, Poi briefly joined Collingwood Magpies in Suncorp Super Netball as a temporary replacement player, covering for the injured Madi Browne. Poi made her debut for Magpies in a Round 6 match against New South Wales Swifts. She went on to play seven games for Magpies. In Round 13, Poi played an integral role in a season highlight for Magpies when they defeated Swifts 64–56. Poi took to the court to replace Kelsey Browne after Browne went down with a knee injury in the second quarter.

New Zealand
Poi has represented New Zealand at schoolgirl, under-21, Fast5 and senior level. She was a member of the New Zealand team that won the 2017 Netball World Youth Cup. She was also a member of the team that won the 2018 Fast5 Netball World Series. On 13 January 2019, Poi made her senior debut for New Zealand in a 2019 Netball Quad Series match against England. On 26 January 2020, Poi made her first start during a 2020 Netball Nations Cup match against South Africa. In October 2020, New Zealand head coach, Noeline Taurua, highlighted Poi for her fitness levels. She was a member of the New Zealand team that won the 2021 Constellation Cup.

Statistics

|- 
! scope="row" style="text-align:center"|2017
|style="text-align:center;"|Pulse
|0/0|| ||  || || || || || || ||1 
|-style="background-color: #eaeaea"
! scope="row" style="text-align:center" |2018
|style="text-align:center;"|Tactix
|0/0||?||0||0||?||17||31||105||36||15 
|- 
! scope="row" style="text-align:center"|2019
|style="text-align:center;"|Tactix
|0/0||167||0||8||330||9||38||123||59||15 
|-style="background-color: #eaeaea"
! scope="row" style="text-align:center"|2019
|style="text-align:center;"|Magpies
|0/0||35||0||60||54||2||3||25||15||7
|- 
! scope="row" style="text-align:center"|2020
|style="text-align:center;"|Tactix
|0/0||147||0||0||321||11||35||75||39||15
|- style="background-color: #eaeaea"
! scope="row" style="text-align:center"|2021
|style="text-align:center;"|Tactix
|0/0||176||0||0||469||13||34||100||41||17  
|- 
! scope="row" style="text-align:center"|2022
|style="text-align:center;"|Tactix
|0/0||200||0||0||412||14||30||71||31||14  
|- style="background-color: #eaeaea"
! scope="row" style="text-align:center"|2023
|style="text-align:center;"|Tactix
|0/0|| ||  || || || || || || || 
|- class="sortbottom"
! colspan=2| Career
! 
! 
! 
! 
! 
! 
! 
! 
! 
! 
|}

Honours
New Zealand
Constellation Cup
Winners: 2021 
Fast5 Netball World Series
Winners: 2018 
Netball World Youth Cup
Winners: 2017
Mainland Tactix
ANZ Premiership
Runners Up: 2020, 2021
Netball New Zealand Super Club
Runners Up: 2018
Central Zone
National Netball League
Winners: 2017 
Runners Up: 2016

References

1997 births
Living people
New Zealand netball players
New Zealand international netball players
New Zealand international Fast5 players
National Netball League (New Zealand) players
ANZ Premiership players
Suncorp Super Netball players
Central Manawa players
Central Pulse players
Mainland Tactix players
Collingwood Magpies Netball players
New Zealand expatriate netball people in Australia
New Zealand Māori netball players
Ngāti Porou people
People educated at Napier Girls' High School
University of Canterbury alumni
Victoria University of Wellington alumni
Sportspeople from Gisborne, New Zealand